The theory of the two demons is a rhetorical device used in Argentine political discourse to disqualify arguments that appear to morally equate violent political subversion with illegal repressive activities carried out by the state.

Since the end of National Reorganization Process and the Dirty War, when guerrilla groups (mainly left-wing Peronist Montoneros and the Marxist-Leninist Ejército Revolucionario del Pueblo or ERP) were persecuted by the armed forces (together with law enforcement agencies and paramilitary groups), this term has been in wide use by people mainly in human rights movements, the political left, and former guerrilla members and supporters. These people argue that a national state, even one controlled by a de facto government, cannot be compared to a guerrilla or other subversive group, the difference being precisely that the institutions of a national state are supposed to act within the confines of law, even when using violence to fight outlaws.

The term "theory of the two demons" is used pejoratively in left-wing discourse, and is attached to public personalities who plead to support "national reconciliation", sometimes appealing to the Christian idea of "forgive and forget", while (allegedly) having ulterior intentions. Since the image of the military has been tarnished by human rights abuses, economic chaos and the Falklands War defeat, accusers claim that advocates of right-wing repression must resort to reconciliation rhetoric, because a plain admission of support would disqualify them in the eyes of most Argentines.

Background
Starting with the kidnapping and assassination of former de facto President Pedro Aramburu by the Montoneros in 1970, armed violence by left-wing groups increased. Some argued for the legitimacy of armed struggle on one or more of the following arguments:

 Argentina was under a military dictatorship.
 The government outlawed political parties and persecuted all forms of dissent, sometimes through violent means.
 Juan Perón, the leader of a vast mass of Argentines, was in exile and forbidden from re-entering the political arena.

The Cuban revolution lent a romantic aura to armed struggle, and many young people found themselves sympathizing with the guerrillas or with left-wing Peronist organizations such as Juventud Peronista (JP), which had a radicalized wing named Tendencia Revolucionaria ("Revolutionary Tendency", sometimes shortened to La Tendencia) which was subject to Montoneros' influence.

It can be argued that none of these groups attempted to terrorize the general populace through random violence. Yet, Montoneros killed notable persons who were not guilty of violence against the people (such as Arturo Mor Roig, the architect of the 1973 democratic transition, labor union leader José Ignacio Rucci. General consensus is that Montoneros carried out assassinations, and their supporters boasted of these, but the organization did not formally claim responsibility for them.) Some operations resulted in the deaths of conscript soldiers or lower-ranking policemen, who could not be held responsible for the alleged crimes of their superiors. Some attacks resulted in the deaths of the families or friends of military officers.

Justification for the criticism
Many have condemned the violence of the guerrilla radical groups (the ends, the means, or both), but feel that the atrocities committed by the armed forces and their associates during the Dirty War that started on 1976 have a different moral status, since the Argentine state under the armed forces dictatorship sought to terrorize the citizenry by means of kidnapping and forced disappearance of persons without trial or recourse of habeas corpus.

The main criticism of the state's measures, as mentioned above, is that a national state is expected to enforce the law and respect human rights, even when repressing violent criminals that do not show such respect. Moreover, Argentine state terrorism included the illegal arrest and disappearance of high-school students asking for a rebate in public transportation, nuns who assisted the poor, and persons who happened to be on a guerrilla's telephone list.

After the restoration of democracy
The Argentine military and other people have expressed different opinions on the Dirty War. A few among the military involved have conceded that their actions were morally wrong and unjustifiable. A number of them have fully acknowledged their commitment and expressed no regrets. A third group refers to the crimes of the military as "excesses", implying that the country was in fact undergoing a war, with two sides fighting for different goals, so that certain objectionable outcomes were inevitably bound to occur, "as in all wars".

Democratic forces were united in their criticism of the military in the run-up to the restoration of democracy in 1983. Less than three months after the inauguration of President Raúl Alfonsín, several critiques of Montoneros arose from within the democratic spectrum. Firstly, Montoneros, la soberbia armada, a book written by the leftist journalist Pablo Giussani, that compared Montoneros to European extreme-left terror organizations. Then, a comprehensive and documented effort by British historian Richard Gillespie titled Montoneros, Soldados de Perón was widely read and contributed to cement a non-romantic image of Montoneros. Juan José Sebreli invested a whole chapter of his Los deseos imaginarios del peronismo to Montoneros, calling it "left-wing fascism". A few years later, Silvia Sigal and Eliseo Verón deconstructed the (verbal) opposition between Perón and Montoneros in the third section of Perón o muerte. Los fundamentos discursivos del fenómeno peronista.

Alfonsín put the military juntas on trial, and prosecuted Montoneros leaders as well, as well as people accused of "illicit organization" with the Montoneros, such as Ricardo Obregón Cano, former Peronist governor of Cordoba deposed in a police coup in February 1974, and sentenced to ten years' prison in 1985. Under the Alfonsín administration, a state committee inquired into the disappearances. When its report was delivered to the government, the Interior Minister, Antonio Tróccoli, gave a speech equating Dirty War criminals and terrorists that was criticized by the leftist and Peronist opposition as an exponent of the "doctrine of the two demons".

In 1988–1989, President Carlos Menem pardoned both the military commanders and the guerilla leaders.

After taking office in 2003, the Néstor Kirchner administration shifted the focus towards the uncovering and punishment of crimes of the Dirty War, including those formerly covered by the now-repealed amnesty laws passed in the mid-1980s. In August 2005, a judge struck Menem's pardons as unconstitutional, and a final pronouncement of the Supreme Court on the matter is expected soon.

The CONADEP report
In 1984, the National Commission on the Disappearance of Persons (CONADEP) published a report titled Nunca Más (Never Again) with extensive research about instances of forced disappearance during the dictatorship. It started with a prologue which read: "During the 1970s, Argentina was shaken by a terror that came both from the extreme right and from the extreme left." For a new edition of the CONADEP report presented at the Buenos Aires Book Fair of 2006, the Human Rights Secretariat added a paragraph stating the following:
"It is necessary to leave it clearly established [...] that it is unacceptable to attempt to justify State terrorism as a sort of game of counteracting violences, as if it were possible to look for a justifying symmetry in the action of individuals faced with the Nation and the State's estrangement from their proper goals."
Journalist Magdalena Ruiz Guiñazú, a former member of CONADEP, criticized the new prologue: "It is a grave historical mistake to think that the report was an apology of the theory of the two demons." Former President Alfonsín endorsed Ruiz Guiñazú's opinion and claimed that the addition of the prologue "shows a dangerous tendency to re-invent history". Human Rights Secretary Eduardo Luis Duhalde justified the change saying that "the original prologue did not match the political philosophy that the State supports today with regards to the prosecution of crimes against humanity". Hebe de Bonafini, president of the Mothers of the Plaza de Mayo, expressed satisfaction over the new text and harshly attacked the original: "Sábato and Tróccoli wrote that shit to talk about two demons. Our children were not demons. They were revolutionaries, guerrilla warriors, wonderful and unique, who defended the country."

See also
 CONADEP
 Dirty War
 Forced disappearance
 Montoneros
 Mothers of the Plaza de Mayo
 National Reorganization Process

References

Notes

Bibliography

External links
Collaborationism with State Terrorism in Argentine culture
Argentina begins healing process by reopening wounds of the Dirty War
Debate Rises in Argentina on Museum of Abuses

Dirty War
Political metaphors